Dennis Bauer (born 18 December 1980) is a German fencer. He won a bronze medal in the team sabre event at the 2000 Summer Olympics.

References

External links
 

1980 births
Living people
German male fencers
Olympic fencers of Germany
Fencers at the 2000 Summer Olympics
Olympic bronze medalists for Germany
Olympic medalists in fencing
Sportspeople from Koblenz
Medalists at the 2000 Summer Olympics
20th-century German people
21st-century German people